EP3 is an EP by English singer-songwriter Ringo Starr, released on 16 September 2022 by Universal Music Enterprises. It was produced by Starr and co-produced by Bruce Sugar, except "Everyone and Everything" which was written and produced by Linda Perry.

Track listing

Personnel
 Ringo Starr – drums, percussion and vocals
 Steve Lukather – guitar
 Linda Perry – guitar, percussion, backing vocals on "Everyone and Everything"
 José Antonio Rodríguez – nylon guitar on "Free Your Soul"
 Billy Mohler – guitar and bass on "Everyone and Everything"
 Nathan East – bass
 Bruce Sugar – keyboards, percussion, horn arrangement on "Let's Be Friends" and "Free Your Soul"
 Joseph Williams – keyboards and backing vocals on "World Go Round"
 Damon Fox – keyboards on "Everyone and Everything"
 Dave Koz – tenor sax on "Free Your Soul"
 Billy Valentine – backing vocals
 Zelma Davis – backing vocals
 Maiya Sykes – backing vocals
 Sam Hollander – percussion and handclaps on "Let's Be Friends"

Production
 Ringo Starr – producer
 Bruce Sugar – producer, mixer
 Logan Taylor – assistant engineer
 Luis Flores – assistant engineer on "Everyone and Everything"
 Chris Bellman (at Bernie Grundman Mastering) – mastering

References

2022 EPs
Ringo Starr albums
Albums produced by Ringo Starr
Universal Music Enterprises albums